Austin Cutting (born October 27, 1996) is a former American football long snapper. He played college football at Air Force and was selected by the Minnesota Vikings in the seventh round of the 2019 NFL Draft.

Professional career
Cutting was drafted by the Minnesota Vikings in the seventh round (250th overall) of the 2019 NFL Draft. There had been precedent, such as Joe Cardona of the 2015 NFL Draft, for military school graduates to be allowed to defer their 24-month service policy, but the United States Secretary of Defense rescinded the policy in 2017 to allow military service academy student-athlete graduates to delay their assignments to explore professional sports opportunities. In June 2019, US President Donald Trump requested that a policy be established to facilitate athletic pursuits and Cutting was the first to sign a professional contract following the new policy.

Cutting was placed on the reserve/COVID-19 list by the team on November 10, 2020, and activated four days later. He was waived on December 1, 2020.

References 

1996 births
Living people
People from Keller, Texas
Players of American football from Texas
Sportspeople from the Dallas–Fort Worth metroplex
American football long snappers
Air Force Falcons football players
Minnesota Vikings players
Military personnel from Texas